Yesenia is a Mexican telenovela, produced by Valentín Pimstein for Telesistema Mexicano in 1970.

Cast 
 Fanny Cano as Yesenia
 Jorge Lavat as Capitán Oswaldo Leroux
 María Teresa Rivas as Magenta
 Alicia Rodríguez as Marisela
 Irma Lozano as Luisita
 Juan Ferrara as Bardo
 María Douglas as Amparo de Bertier
 Augusto Benedico as Julio Bertier
 Magda Guzmán as Trifenia
 Raúl "Chato" Padilla as El Patriarca Rashay
 Tony Carbajal as Román Flaubert
 Oscar Morelli as Jack Howard
 Lupita Lara as Orlenda

See also 
Yesenia (1971)
Yesenia (1987 TV series)

References

External links 

Mexican telenovelas
1970 telenovelas
Televisa telenovelas
1970 Mexican television series debuts
1970 Mexican television series endings
Spanish-language telenovelas
Television shows based on comics
Fictional representations of Romani people